Stragari is a rural settlement within the City of Kragujevac.

Geography
Located at 250 m above sea level, it lies 30 km northwest of Kragujevac and about 120 km south of state capital, Belgrade. It lies on the outfall of Srebrnica river intо Jasenica River, on the northeastern side of the Rudnik Mountain (highest peak - Cvijić's peak, 1,132 m).

Stragari is the place of one of the biggest asbestos mines in Europe.

History

In 1425 Stefan Lazarević held a major meeting in Srebrnica because of the question on who would succeed him to the Serb throne (he had no children), he chose Đurađ Branković.
Stragari is mentioned for the first time in Turkish census documentation in 1476 as Strgar. At that time, Stragari had only 39 households. From 1717 to 1739 the town saw a large influx of Austrians. In monastery Voljavča near Stragari in 1805, the First Serbian government (called "Praviteljstvujušči sovjet") held their first sessions. It received the status of town in 1922. 

From May 2002, Stragari (along with 10 other settlements), formed one of five city municipalities which consisted the City of Kragujevac. However, the City municipality of Stragari was dissolved in March 2008.

Economy
This is an agricultural area and farmers are producing fruit, vegetables and breeding cattle. The main industrial plant is Stragarit (paper industry). Stragari has the preconditions necessary for development of a tourism industry.

The spa "Voljavča" and the monastery with the same name are located there as well as good facilities for recreation activities and hunting.

Gallery

References

External links

 Zvanična prezentacija varošice Stragari
 Stragari na internetu

Populated places in Šumadija District
Šumadija
Defunct urban municipalities of Kragujevac